(born 1939) is the leading Japanese practitioner of the "natural farming" method popularized by Masanobu Fukuoka and has farmed by this method in Sakurai City, Nara Prefecture for 30 years.

Influences
Kawaguchi was born the eldest son of a tenant farmer of many generations; unlike Fukuoka, who was from the landlord class. Kawaguchi aspired to become a painter and attended Tennoji Art Institute, whilst continuing to work at the family's farm. His father died when Kawaguchi was only 11 years old, which meant he was forced to join the family farm. However, in 1978, after 22 years of conventional farming, he experienced severe liver damage caused by the agricultural chemical fertilizers, herbicides and pesticides used on the farm. The failure of allopathic doctors to cure him led in response to Kawaguchi discovering Fukuoka's seminal book The One Straw Revolution, studying and starting to promote both Natural Farming and Traditional Chinese Medicine. He was also influenced by Wes Jackson, the founder and former president of The Land Institute; Kawaguchi is said to be the leading representative of the second generation of Natural Farming, using a gentler, more flexible approach to Fukuoka's, in which there are no definitive rules and each application depends on the individual environment.

Natural farming
The natural farming method of Masanobu Fukuoka uses no fertilizers or chemicals and very little water, allowing crops and weeds to grow freely, requiring a minimum of human intervention. Although his work is based on Fukuoka's natural farming principles, Kawaguchi's own methods differ notably from those of Fukuoka. The divergence is expected; as the foundation of natural farming is not in a technique, but in a way of approaching nature with awareness and respect.

Kawaguchi states the core values of natural farming as:

 Do not plow the fields
 Weeds and insects are not your enemies
 There is no need to add fertilizers
 Adjust the foods you grow based on your local climate and conditions

With these values in place, he argues, you can grow food in most places in the world without need for imported resources including fertilizers.

His own first attempts were not successful until, he says, he understood that the aim was to cultivate land as in the very early days of cultivation rather than to let it go totally wild.

Achievements
In 1991, he started Akame Natural Farming School which currently has more than 10 sites and another 5 teaching traditional medicine and around 250 students. It is one of a number of volunteer-run "no tuition" agricultural schools in Japan. Graduates from the school have further opened 44 learning sites throughout Japan, where approximately 900 people study 'Natural Farming'. Kawaguchi is at the heart of the contemporary Natural Farmers network in Japan.

He is a central character in the 2015 documentary film Final Straw: Food, Earth, Happiness, one of 25 films chosen for the Global Environmental Justice Collection used in university courses on sustainability in North America. The collection won the Buchanan Prize in 2020. In 1997, his work was featured in "Natural Farming - The World of Kawaguchi Yosikazu," a documentary at the Yamagata International Documentary Festival and shown at the 2010 International Film Festival on Organic Farming in Tokyo.

In 2008 he spoke at the 17th National Gathering of Natural Farming Practitioners along with Manabu Sakai (member of House of Representatives) and representatives from the Ministry of Agriculture, Forestry and Fisheries, the Ministry of Environment and the Agricultural and Life Sciences Department of University of Tokyo.

Bibliography
 Kawaguchi, Yoshikazu 川口由一 Taenaru Hatake ni Tachite『妙なる畑に立ちて』 (Standing in the Exquisite Garden). Shizuoka: Yasosha Publishing Co., 1990.
 Kawaguchi, Yoshikazu 川口由一 Shizen-No kara No wo Koete『自然農から 農を超えて』(From Natural Farming, Beyond Farming). Sendai: Katatumuri Publishing Co., 1993.
 Kawaguchi, Yoshikazu 川口由一 and Toriyama, Toshiko. 鳥山敏子 Shizen-No『自然農』(Natural Farming). Tokyo: Banseishobo Publishing Co., 2000.

Filmography
 Final Straw: Food, Earth, Happiness, Patrick M. Lydon and Suhee Kang, SocieCity Films 2016.
 Natural Farming, Toshiko, Toriyama and Koizumi Shukichi, Group Gendai Inc. 1997.
 「 人類の明日を悟る 」 (Understand the Future of Humanity) － 自然農上映会 シンポジウム 演奏 対談 － 主催・赤目自然農塾　制作・加治幸博

See also
 Organic farming
 Nature Farming

References
  Suutari, Amanda. "Hands in the Soil: Natural farming" with Kawaguchi Yoshikazu, Kyoto Journal, v. 53, 2003.
 子どもの未来と自然農　～川口由一　自然農・子育て・家族を語る～, 川口由一 and 鳥山敏子. Publisher, 有限会社フィオーナ

External links

Akame Natural Farming School
Earth Village Network
Natural Farming homepage in Japanese

1939 births
Japanese educators
Japanese environmentalists
Japanese farmers
Non-fiction environmental writers
People from Nara Prefecture
Living people